Rene Bertram (born 21 July 1981 in Magdeburg) is a German rower.

References

External links 
 
 

1981 births
Living people
Sportspeople from Magdeburg
Rowers at the 2004 Summer Olympics
Rowers at the 2008 Summer Olympics
Olympic rowers of Germany
World Rowing Championships medalists for Germany
German male rowers